Val-de-Bonnieure (literally Valley  of Bonnieure) is a commune in the department of Charente, southwestern France. The municipality was established on 1 January 2018 by merger of the former communes of Saint-Angeau (the seat), Saint-Amant-de-Bonnieure and Sainte-Colombe.

See also 
Communes of the Charente department

References 

Communes of Charente